Newport World Resorts (formerly Resorts World Manila) is an integrated resort, located in Newport City, opposite Ninoy Aquino International Airport (NAIA) Terminal 3, in Pasay, Metro Manila, Philippines. The resort is owned and operated by Travellers International Hotel Group, Inc. (TIHGI), a joint venture between Alliance Global Group and Genting Hong Kong. The project, occupying part of a former military camp, has four hotels, casino gambling areas, a shopping mall, cinemas, restaurants, clubs and a theater. A soft launch of the resort took place on August 28, 2009. Resorts World Manila is the sister resort to Resorts World Genting in Malaysia and Resorts World Sentosa in Singapore. It was the first integrated resort in Metro Manila, and from 2009 to 2013 it was the only one in operation until the opening of Solaire Resort & Casino in Entertainment City, Parañaque on March 16, 2013.

On June 2, 2017, dozens of people died after a robbery caused a stampede and the perpetrator set a fire, leaving 38 people dead and 54 wounded. The casino temporarily suspended its operation and had its license suspended by PAGCOR on June 9, 2017. The license suspension was lifted on June 29, 2017, and on the same day Resorts World Manila resumed its gambling operations in gaming areas not affected by the attack.

On July 20, 2022, Alliance Global rebranded Resorts World Manila into "Newport World Resorts".

Hotels
Seven hotels are currently operating within the integrated resort. Hilton, Sheraton and Okura are located at the adjacent Grand Wing connected by a bridge from the second level of Newport Mall.

Restaurants
 Cafe Maxims - Paris-inspired cafe
 Passion - Cantonese fine dining
 Ginzadon - Japanese and Korean cuisine
 Victoria Harbour Cafe - casual dining Asian restaurant
 Franks - sports themed snack bar
 New York Pinoy Deli - casual dining restaurant offering a fusion of American and Filipino cuisine
 Prosperity Court - casual dining restaurant offering Asian, Filipino and other cuisine
 Bar 360 - Bar and entertainment venue featuring live bands, vocal performers and acrobatic acts daily
 Bar 180 - Bar and entertainment venue featuring lounge singers nightly
 The Terrace - Mediterranean themed restaurant, breakfast buffet for Maxims Hotel guests, and all-day dining with a wide array of Mediterranean salads, pasta, and pizza

Theater

The Newport Performing Arts Theater is a 1,500-seat venue for concerts, plays, musicals, conferences and other events. It was designed by Hong Kong-based interior designer Joseph Sy. The theater's vestibule also serves as a venue for various types of functions.

Meetings, incentives, conferences and exhibitions
Newport World Resorts formally opened in July 2015 the Marriott Grand Ballroom. Touted as the largest hotel ballroom in the Philippines, its main feature is a 3,000 sqm pillarless ballroom that can seat up to 2,500 people for a banquet event, and up to 4,500 for a concert setup. The main ballroom can be subdivided into four sections for smaller events, but there are other venues within the facility for a total of 28 spaces for various events.

Casino

Newport World Resorts has gambling areas occupying three floors in its main casino, featuring table games, slot machines and electronic table games. More gambling spaces are available at the Remington Entertainment Center inside Remington Hotel.

The Newport Grand Wing gaming area, opened late 2018, features more gaming space and serves as a podium of Sheraton, Hilton and Okura hotels along with more retail and dining spaces.

2017 casino attack

On June 2, 2017, at midnight, 36 people died from suffocation with 70 others injured after a gunman set fire to gambling tables and slot machine chairs inside the Resorts World Manila casino. On Friday, the gunman was found dead in the Maxims Hotel adjacent to the casino. The gunman was later identified as Jessie Carlos.

See also
 Gambling in Metro Manila

External links

 Resorts World Manila's Official Website
 Resorts World Manila to bring beloved fairy tale to life
 Philippine bid for Asia Gaming Crown

References

 

Casinos completed in 2010
Casinos in Metro Manila
Hotels in Metro Manila
Buildings and structures in Pasay
Tourist attractions in Metro Manila
Resorts in the Philippines